Dr. Joy Angela DeGruy is an author, academic, and researcher, who previously served as assistant professor at the Portland State University School of Social Work. She is current president and CEO of DeGruy Publications, Inc. She is most known for her book Post Traumatic Slave Syndrome, originally published by UpTone Press in 2005 and revised and republished in 2017 by JDP Inc. DeGruy and her research projects have featured in news and activist coverage of contemporary African-American social issues, in addition to public lectures and workshops on U.S. college campuses that include: Morehouse School of Medicine, Fisk University, Spelman College, Harvard University, Yale University, Princeton University, Smith College, Massachusetts Institute of Technology (MIT). Dr DeGruy has spoken at the United Nations, UNESCO, C-SPAN, Oxford University, Association of Black Psychologists, National Association of Social Workers, the World Bank, The Essence Festival, and featured in Essence Magazine, and films that include: "Cracking the Codes" a film by Shakti Butler (World Trust Organization),"InVisible Portraits"by Oge Egbuonu on the Oprah Winfrey Network (OWN), among others. Dr. Degruy has also received a 2021 grant from the MacArthur Foundation to further her healing work.

Early life and education 
DeGruy was born October 16, 1957, in Los Angeles California. She was the youngest of four children born to working class parents, Oscar DeGruy, a truck driver and Nellie Parker DeGruy, a stay at home mom.  

Joy attended elementary school, junior high school, and senior high school in Los Angeles Unified School District. She participated in a dual enrollment program  that allowed her to complete junior college coursework while a student at Crenshaw High School. 

DeGruy holds a bachelor's of science in Speech Communication from Portland State University, two master's degrees (in Social Work from Portland State and Clinical Psychology from Pacific University), and a Ph.D. in Social Work and Social Research from Portland State University's Graduate School of Social Work. Her doctoral dissertation studied predictive variables for African American Male Youth Violence using Sociocultural Theory, Social Learning Theory and Trauma Theory frameworks; she also employed the "new" theory of Post Traumatic Slave Syndrome, which would later become the subject of her 2005 book, Post Traumatic Slave Syndrome: America's Legacy of Enduring Injury and Healing. Professor Eileen M. Brennan served as DeGruy's dissertation advisor.

Teaching 
From 2001 to 2014, DeGruy was an assistant professor in the School of Social Work at Portland State University, where she taught core classes in Human Behavior in the Social Environment, Generalist Practice, Field Instruction, African American Community (Seminar),  African American Multigenerational Trauma & Issues of Violence,  and Diversity and Social Justice.

Starting in 2019, DeGruy began teaching 10-week online courses for Joy DeGruy Publications, Inc. The courses include: Introduction to Post Traumatic Slave Syndrome, Advanced M-4 Model Implementation: The Relationship Approach: Multi-Disciplinary, Multi-Systemic, Multi-Cultural Model and African American Multigenerational Trauma & Implementing Models of Change.

Research and publications 

DeGruy's most famous work is undoubtedly her theorization of Post Traumatic Slave Syndrome ("PTSS"), which she describes as:... a theory that explains the etiology of many of the adaptive survival behaviors in African American communities throughout the United States and the Diaspora. It is a condition that exists as a consequence of multigenerational oppression of Africans and their descendants resulting from centuries of chattel slavery. A form of slavery which was predicated on the belief that African Americans were inherently/genetically inferior to whites. This was then followed by institutionalized racism which continues to perpetuate injury.... Under such circumstances these are some of the predictable patterns of behavior that tend to occur: Vacant Esteem...Marked Propensity for Anger and Violence...Racist Socialization and (internalized racism)... In an interview for Essence Magazine, DeGruy summarizes: "research has shown that severe trauma can affect multiple generations ... no one has ever measured the impact that slavery had on us, what it’s meant for us to live for centuries in a hostile environment. We have been hurt, not just by the obvious physical assaults, but in deep psychological ways..."

DeGruy's theorization is based on qualitative and quantitative research conducted by the author in both America and Africa.

Critical reception 
The New Republic described the theory as "original thinking" that "explains[s] the effects of unresolved trauma on the behaviors of blacks that is transmitted from generation to generation," and suggested that the theory can be historicized more broadly a said P.T.S.S. "lays the groundwork for understanding how the past has influenced the present, and opens up the discussion of how we can use the strengths we have gained to heal."

DeGruy's theory is not without controversy. P.T.S.S. has been criticized by scholars such as Ibram X. Kendi, who included it in his history of racist ideas in America, Stamped from the Beginning. 

Others defend her work: (Guy Emerson Mount Assistant Professor of African American Studies at Auburn University, offers a counter assessment for Kendi's critique)

This post was inspired by Professor Ibram X. Kendi’s insightful AAIHS critique of Professor Joy DeGruy’s equally insightful book Post Traumatic Slave Syndrome.  In the spirit of full disclosure, Professor Kendi and I are both contributors to a forthcoming AAIHS anthology titled New Perspectives on the Black Intellectual Tradition, edited by Keisha N. Blain, Chris Cameron and Ashley D. Farmer.  At the same time, Professor DeGruy is a family friend. I’ve hung out with her nephew and attended her daughter’s wedding. My wife and her sisters grew up with her as a role model  . . . Having said that, I am sympathetic to many of the critiques that Professor Kendi has put forward.  Yet I also believe that post traumatic slave syndrome (PTSS) can still be reconciled to those critiques and, in the hands of skilled practitioners, advance an anti-racist agenda (even if it is, as Professor Kendi says, a “racist idea”).

In the end, Professor Kendi is right to worry that PTSS will, at the very least, fall into the wrong hands and be used by racist forces as further confirmation of black cultural/psychological/ontological inferiority . . . Prof. Kendi anticipates racist forces will misread and weaponize PTSS in the same way that they have done with almost every other previous black self-help idea including most recently the stop the violence movements of the 1990s aimed at reducing ‘black-on-black crime.’  But Professor DeGruy is, at the end of the day, simply a black psychologist trying to help black people survive psychically in a world that is trying daily to strip them of their humanity.  Professor Kendi is right—the world has not succeeded in doing so.  But Professor DeGruy is also right—we could all use a little healing.

Suggested Readings and Films

Akbar, N. (1990). Chains and Images of Psychological Slavery. New Jersey: New
Mind Productions.

Alexander, M. (2010). The new jim crow: Mass incarceration in the age of colorblindness. New York, NY: The New Press.

Allen, J., Als, H., J. Lewis, & L. F. Litwack. (2000). Without Sanctuary: Lynching
Photography in America. New Mexico: Twin Palms Publishers.

Asante, M. K., & K. W. Asante. (1985). African Culture: The Rhythms of Unity.
Westport, CN: Greenwood Press.

Bell, C. & Gaudet, R. (2017) Misdiagnosis of Neurobehavoral Disorders Associated with Fetal Alcohol Exposure in Adults Bell and Gaudet. Clinical Medical Reviews
and Case Reports, Clin Med Rev Case Rep 2017, 4:153

Battalora, J. (2013). Birth of a White Nation: The Invention of White People and its Relevance Today. Strategic Book Publishing, Houston, TX.

Bell, C. C., & J. E. Jenkins. (1991). Traumatic Stress and Children. Journal of
Health Care for the Poor and Underserved, 2 (1)175-188

Butterfield, F. (1995). All God’s Children: The Bosket Family and the American
Tradition of Violence. New York: Avon Books

Byrd, A. D., L. L. Tharps, (2001). Hair Story: Untangling the Roots of Black Hair
in America. New York: St: Martin’s Press.

Cole, D. (1999). No Equal Justice: Race and Class in the American Criminal Justice
System. New York: The New Press.

Coates, T. (2015). Between The World and Me. Random House Books, NY

Francis, R. C. (2011). Epigenetics: How environment shapes our genes. New York, NY: W. W. Norton & Company, Inc.

Fullilove, M., & Wallace, R. (2011). Serial forced displacement in American Cities, 1916-2010. Journal of Urban Health, 88(3), 381-389. 

Ginzburg, R. (1988). 100 Years of lynching. Baltimore, MD: Black Classic
Press.

Grier, W. H., & P. M. Cobbs. (1969). Black Rage. New York: Bantam Books.

Hacker, A. (1992). Two Nations: Black and white, separate, hostile, unequal.
New York, NY: Macmillan publishing Company. 

Herum, A. (2013, February 26). Preventing the intergenerational transmission of trauma. Families in Psychiatry, Clinical Psychiatry News Digital Network. 

Kalayjian, A. & Eugene, D. (2010). Mass trauma and emotional healing around the world[2 volumes]: Rituals and practices for resilience and meaning-making. Santa Barbara, CA: Praeger, ABC CLIO.

Kapsalis, T. (1997) Public Privates: Performing Gynecology From Both Ends of the
Speculum. Durham, NC: Duke University Press.

Kendi, I. X. (2016). Stamped from the beginning: The definitive history of racist ideas in America. Hatchette Book Group, NY: New York. 

Lange, S., Probst, C., Gmel, G., Rehm, J., Burd, L, & Popova, S. (2017) Global Prevalence of Fetal Alcohol Spectrum Disorder Among Children and Youth A Systematic Review and Meta-analysis. DJAMA Pediatrics.

Leary J. D., Brennan, E. & Briggs, H. (2005). African American Respect Scale -
A Measure of a Prosocial Attitude. Research on Social Work Practice.

Mbiti, J. (1970). African Religions and Philosophy. New York: Doubleday.

Morris, T. (1996). Southern Slavery and the Law, 1619-1860. Chapel Hill, NC:
The University of North Carolina Press.

Morrison, T. (2017).  The Origin of Others. Harvard University Press. Cambridge, Massachusetts. 

Muhammad, K. G. (2010) The condemnation of blackness: Race, crime and the making of modern urban America. Cambridge, Massachusetts, Harvard University Press.

National Spiritual Assembly. (1991). The Vision of Race Unity: America’s Most
Challenging Issue. Wilmette, Il: Baha’i Publishing Trust

Newkirk, P. (2015) Spectacle: The astonishing life of Ota Benga New York: Amistad Books, Harper Collins Publishing.

Nichols, E. J. (1976). Introduction to the Axiological Model. Paper Presented
to the World Psychiatric Association and the Nigerian Association of
Psychiatrists. University of Ibadan, Nigeria.

Painter, N. I. (2010). The history of white people. New York, NY: W. W. Norton & Company

Roberts, D. (1999). Killing the Black Body. New York: Vintage Books.

Robinson, R. (2004). Quitting America: The Departure of a Black Man From His
Native Land. New York: Dutton.

Robinson, R. (2000). The Debt: What America Owes to Blacks. New York:
Penguin.

Rothstein, R. (2017). The Color of Law, Liveright Publishing Corporation. NY.

Somé, S. (1997) The spirit of intimacy ancient African teachings in the ways of relationships. New York, NY: Harper Collins Publishers Inc.
Smith, D. L. (2011). Less than human: Why we demean, enslave, and exterminate others. St. Martin’s Press.

Stamper, N. (2005). Breaking rank. New York: NY Avalon Press.

Stevenson, B. (2014). Just Mercy: A Story of Justice and Redemption. Spiegel & Grau, NY.

Stevenson, H. C. (1994). Racial Socialization in African American Families:
The Art of Balancing Intolerance and Survival. The Family Journal:
Counseling Therapy for Couples and Families. 2 (3), 190-198.

Stevenson, H. C. (1994). Relationship of Adolescent Perceptions of Racial
Socialization to Racial Identity. Journal of Black Psycholog y. 21 (1) 49-70

Tatum, B. D. (1997). Why Are All the Black Kids Sitting Together in the Cafeteria?
New York: Basic Books.

Universal House of Justice. (1985). The Promise of World Peace. Wilmette, Il:
Baha’i Publishing Trust.

Washington, H. (2006). Medical Apartheid; The Dark History of Medical Experimentation on Black Americans from Colonial Times to the Present. New York: Doubleday.

West, C. (1993). Race Matters. Boston, MA: Beacon Press.

Wilkerson, I. (2020) Caste: The origins of our discontent. New York: NY Random House Books.

Wilkerson, I. (2011) The warmth of other suns. New York: NY Random House Books.

Winbush, R. A. (2001). Should America pay? New York, Harper Collins Books

Suggested Films

(In) Visible Portraits Directed by Oge Egbuonu (2020)
I am Not Your Negro, (Magnolia Pictures & Magnet Releasing) (2017)
13th Ava Duvernay Documentary (2016)
Cracking the Codes (Shakti Butler) (2013)
Unnatural Causes (PBS) Documentary

See also 

 Gail E. Wyatt
 bell hooks
 W. E. B. Du Bois
 African-American Studies
 Whiteness Studies

References 

Portland State University alumni
Portland State University faculty
Clinical psychologists
African-American educators
African-American writers
Year of birth missing (living people)
Living people
21st-century African-American people